Joseph Butler (born 7 February 1943) is a retired football right back best known for his spell at Swindon Town.

Newcastle United

Joe Butler started his football career as a junior with his hometime club Newcastle United. He made his senior debut in the 1963 Football League Cup loss at Bournemouth & Boscombe. Later, during the same season, Joe Butler played his only three league games for the Magpies. His league debut came in the 2–1 loss at Manchester City and then appearing at St James' Park in a 5–2 victory over Rotherham United before making his final appearance in the 4–0 loss to Bury.

Swindon Town

In 1965, Swindon Town paid Newcastle United £5,500 to secure the services of Joe Butler. The fee would see Butler remain in Wiltshire for eleven seasons. During his spell at Swindon he famously helped his club win the Football League Cup in 1969 against Arsenal and Anglo-Italian Cup victories over AS Roma and Napoli.

Honours
1969 League Cup Winner
1969 Anglo-Italian League Cup Winner
1970 Anglo-Italian Cup Winner
1968-69 Football League Third Division (Runners-Up)

References

1943 births
Living people
Swindon Town F.C. players
Newcastle United F.C. players
Aldershot F.C. players
Witney Town F.C. players
English Football League players
Association football fullbacks
English footballers
Footballers from Newcastle upon Tyne